Obruk Dam is an embankment dam on the Kızılırmak River in Çorum Province, Turkey. Constructed between 1996 and 2007, the development was backed by the Turkish State Hydraulic Works. The dam supports a 203 MW power station.

See also

List of dams and reservoirs in Turkey

References

External links
DSI, State Hydraulic Works (Turkey), Retrieved December 16, 2009

Dams in Çorum Province
Hydroelectric power stations in Turkey
Dams completed in 2007
Kızılırmak